Mojo is a public artwork, by Christian Moeller. It is located at the Centre Street Lofts, 285 West 6th Street, at the corner of West 7th and Centre Streets, Los Angeles, California.

References

External links
Flickr.com: "lifeontheedge"
Christian-moeller.com

Outdoor sculptures in Greater Los Angeles
2008 sculptures
Downtown Los Angeles